Hibbertia arcuata is a species of flowering plant in the family Dilleniaceae and is endemic to Western Australia. It is an erect shrub with spirally arranged, narrow oblong to narrow elliptic leaves and golden yellow flowers arranged singly in leaf axils with fifteen to twenty-eight stamens arranged around the two carpels.

Description
Fifteen to twenty-eight stamens are arranged around the two carpels that each contain six or eight ovules. Flowering occurs from July to October.

Taxonomy
Hibbertia arcuata was first formally described in 1994 by Judith R. Wheeler in the journal Nuytsia from specimens she collected near Kalannie in 1988. The specific epithet (arcuata) means "curved like a bow", referring to the leaves.

Distribution and habitat
This hibbertia grows in shrubland or woodland in the Avon Wheatbelt, and between Mullewa, Pindar, Paynes Find, Beacon and Wyalkatchem.

See also
List of Hibbertia species

References

arcuata
Flora of Western Australia
Plants described in 1994